X.21 (sometimes referred to as X21) is an interface specification for differential communications introduced in the mid-1970s by the ITU-T. X.21 was first introduced as a means to provide a digital signaling interface for telecommunications between carriers and customers' equipment. This includes specifications for DTE/DCE physical interface elements, alignment of call control characters and error checking, elements of the call control phase for circuit switching services, and test loops.

When X.21 is used with V.11, it provides synchronous data transmission at rates from 600 bit/s to 10 Mbit/s. There is also a variant of X.21 that is only used in select legacy applications, “circuit switched X.21”. X.21 normally is found on a 15-pin D-sub connector and is capable of running full-duplex data transmissions.

The Signal Element Timing, or clock, is provided by the carrier (the telephone company), and is responsible for correct clocking of the data. X.21 was primarily used in Europe and Japan, for example in the Scandinavian DATEX and German  circuit-switched networks during the 1980s.

References
Article based on X.21 at FOLDOC, and X.21 Pinouts, used with permission.

External links
An X.21 brief Tutorial and overview
X.21 pinout and some explanations

Physical layer protocols
ITU-T recommendations
ITU-T X Series Recommendations